Since Alabama became a U.S. state in 1819, it has sent  congressional delegations to the United States Senate and United States House of Representatives. Each state elects two senators to serve for six years, and members of the House to two-year terms. Before becoming a state, the Alabama Territory elected a non-voting delegate at-large to Congress from 1818 to 1819.

These are tables of congressional delegations from Alabama to the United States Senate and the United States House of Representatives.

Current delegation

Alabama's current congressional delegation in the  consists of its two senators, both of whom are Republicans, and its seven representatives: 6 Republicans, 1 Democrat.

The current dean of the Alabama delegation is Representative Robert Aderholt, having served in the U.S. Congress since 1997.

United States Senate

United States House of Representatives

1818–1819: 1 non-voting delegate
Starting on January 29, 1818, Alabama Territory sent a non-voting delegate to the House.

1819–1823: 1 seat
After statehood on December 14, 1819, Alabama had one seat in the House.

1823–1833: 3 seats
Following the 1820 census, Alabama had three seats.

1833–1843: 5 seats
Following the 1830 census, Alabama had five seats. During the 27th Congress, those seats were all elected statewide at-large on a general ticket.

1843–1863: 7 seats
Following the 1840 census, Alabama resumed the use of districts, now increased to seven.

1863–1873: 6 seats
Following the 1860 census, Alabama was apportioned six seats.

1873–1893: 8 seats
Following the 1870 census, Alabama was apportioned eight seats. From 1873 to 1877, the two new seats were elected at large, statewide. After 1877, however, the entire delegation was redistricted.

1893–1913: 9 seats 
Following the 1890 census, Alabama was apportioned nine seats.

1913–1933: 10 seats 
Following the 1910 census, Alabama was apportioned ten seats. At first, the extra seat was elected at-large.

1933–1963: 9 seats 
Following the 1930 census, Alabama was apportioned nine seats.

1963–1973: 8 seats 
Following the 1960 census, Alabama was apportioned eight seats. During the 88th Congress, those seats were all elected statewide at-large on a general ticket.

1973–present: 7 seats 
Since the 1970 census, Alabama has been apportioned seven seats.

Key

See also

 List of United States congressional districts
 Alabama's congressional districts
 Political party strength in Alabama

Notes

References 

 
 
Alabama
Politics of Alabama
Congressional delegations